is a Japanese international rugby union player who plays as a hooker.   He currently plays for Stade Toulousain in the French Top 14. On 20 August 2019, he was officially transferred to the French professional rugby team Stade Toulousain

Club career

Hino has spent his entire senior career with Yamaha Júbilo, who he joined in 2012.   He only made 2 appearances in his debut campaign, but from the following season, he established himself as a regular and has played over 50 times in the Top League.

International

Hino was one of several Yamaha Júbilo players to receive their first call-up to Japan's senior squad ahead of the 2016 end-of-year rugby union internationals.

References

External links

1990 births
Living people
Japanese rugby union players
Japan international rugby union players
Rugby union hookers
Shizuoka Blue Revs players
Stade Toulousain players
Sportspeople from Fukuoka Prefecture
Doshisha University alumni
Sunwolves players